Joan of Ozark is a 1942 American comedy film directed by Joseph Santley and starring Judy Canova, Joe E. Brown and Eddie Foy Jr. It was one of thirteen films Canova made with Republic Studios. It is also known by the alternative title The Queen of Spies.

Synopsis
A hillbilly manages to foil a ring of Nazi spies operating in the United States.

Cast
 Judy Canova as Judy Hull 
 Joe E. Brown as Cliff Little 
 Eddie Foy Jr. as Eddie McCabe 
 Jerome Cowan as Phillip Munson 
 Alexander Granach as  Guido 
 Anne Jeffreys as Marie Lamont 
 Otto Reichow as Otto 
 Donald Curtis as Leonard Jones 
 Wolfgang Zilzer as Kurt 
 Hans Heinrich von Twardowski as Hans
 Harry Hayden as Mayor Fadden 
 Wilhelm von Brincken as German Radio Operator

References

Bibliography
 Hurst, Richard M. Republic Studios: Beyond Poverty Row and the Majors. Scarecrow Press, 2007.

External links

1942 films
American comedy films
American black-and-white films
1942 comedy films
1940s English-language films
Films directed by Joseph Santley
Republic Pictures films
Films with screenplays by Jack Townley
1940s American films
Films about hillbillies